Porac Airfield was a World War II airfield located at Porac to the east of the Porac River in the province of Pampanga on the island of Luzon in the Philippines. It was closed after the war.

History
Porac Airfield was a single runway airfield prior to the war. A taxiway ran parallel to the runway, with a dispersal area near the northern end of the strip. It was used by the Japanese during their occupation. Late in the war, after liberation, it was used by combined Filipino and American military units in early 1945, such as the USAAF 58th Fighter Group (18 April-10 July 1945), and the 375th Troop Carrier Group (20 May–August 1945). Porac was also used by the 201st Mexican Expeditionary Air Force, flying P-47 Thunderbolts.

The airfield was abandoned after the war and is now part of the town, with the runway being used as a road.

See also

 USAAF in the Southwest Pacific

References

 Maurer, Maurer (1983). Air Force Combat Units Of World War II. Maxwell AFB, Alabama: Office of Air Force History. .
 www.pacificwrecks.com

External links

Defunct airports in the Philippines
Airfields of the United States Army Air Forces in the Philippines
Military history of the Philippines during World War II
Military facilities in Pampanga
History of Pampanga
Military airbases established in 1940